Joshua Fernander (born 16 September 1998) is a Bahamian footballer who plays for Hesston College and the Bahamas national football team.

International career
Fernander made his senior international debut on 12 October 2018 in a 6–0 defeat to Antigua and Barbuda in CONCACAF Nations League qualifying.

References

External links

Profile at Hesston College

1998 births
Living people
Bahamian footballers
Bahamas international footballers
Association football defenders